David Standridge is an American politician from the state of Alabama. A member of the Republican Party, Standridge serves in the Alabama House of Representatives, representing the 34th district and is from Hayden, Alabama.

Standridge was elected to the Alabama House in 2012. He previously served as a probate judge in Blount County, Alabama. In 2014, he was elected to serve as Chairman of the House Rural Caucus. In 2016, Standridge called for Robert J. Bentley, the Governor of Alabama, to resign following allegations of an affair. In 2018 he proposed legislation, subsequently adopted by the legislature, that gives "public bodies" the right to display "In God We Trust".

References

Living people
Republican Party members of the Alabama House of Representatives
People from Blount County, Alabama
Year of birth missing (living people)
21st-century American politicians
Probate court judges in the United States